Let's Kill All the Lawyers is a 1992 American independent comedy-drama film written by, directed by and starring Ron Senkowski. It is Senkowski's directorial debut.

Cast
Rick Frederick as Foster Merkul
James Vezina as Junior Rawley
Michelle DeVuono as Satori Bunko
Lee Gusta as Pope
Cheryl Roy as Larissa
Joanne Long as Penelope
Sonya A. Avakian as Tortuously Intricate Lawyer
Ron Senkowski as Crazy Mikey
Lewis Arquette as Antinus
Dick Butkus as The Turnkey
Hamilton Camp as Marcus
Richard Moll as The Centurian
Felton Perry as Cyrus

Production
The film was shot in Michigan.

References

External links

American comedy-drama films
American independent films
Films shot in Michigan
1992 directorial debut films
1992 films
1992 comedy-drama films
1990s English-language films
1990s American films